The Odessa Jackalopes are a Tier II junior ice hockey team playing in the North American Hockey League (NAHL). The team is based in Odessa, Texas and plays their home games at Ector County Coliseum.

History 

The franchise first played as the Owatonna Express in Owatonna, Minnesota, in 2008 replacing the recently relocated Southern Minnesota Express. The Express played their home games at the Four Seasons Centre at the Steele County Fairgrounds. The Express played in the Central Division for three seasons from 2008 to 2011 until the team was sold to the Odessa Jackalopes in 2011.

A previous minor professional hockey franchise known as the Odessa Jackalopes played in the Western Professional Hockey League and Central Hockey League from 1997 to 2011.

Broadcasting
The team's games are broadcast over the internet via Hockey TV. They also use their YouTube channel to broadcast but it is strictly audio only.

Season-by-season records

Playoffs
2009
First Round – Owatonna Express defeated North Iowa Outlaws, 3-games-to-1
Second Round – Bismarck Bobcats defeated Owatonna Express, 3-games-to-2
2010
First Round – Alexandria Blizzard defeated Owatonna Express, 3-games-to-1
2011
Division Semifinals – Coulee Region Chill defeated Owatonna Express, 3-games-to-1
2012
Division Semifinals – Amarillo Bulls defeated Odessa Jackalopes, 3-games-to-1
2016
Division Semifinals – Wichita Falls Wildcats defeated Odessa Jackalopes, 3-games-to-0
2018
Division Semifinals – Lone Star Brahmas defeated Odessa Jackalopes, 3-games-to-0

References

External links 
Odessa Jackalopes

Sports in Odessa, Texas
North American Hockey League teams
North American Hockey League
Ice hockey teams in Texas
Ice hockey clubs established in 1997